Cibyra saguanmachica is a species of moth of the family Hepialidae. It is known from Colombia.

Etymology 
The moth is named after Saguamanchica, the second ruler (zipa) of the southern Muisca with capital Bacatá.

References

External links 
 Hepialidae genera

Hepialidae
Endemic fauna of Colombia
Lepidoptera of Colombia
Moths of South America
Altiplano Cundiboyacense
Saguamanchica
Moths described in 1914